Philomycus carolinianus, common name the Carolina mantleslug, is a species of land slug, a terrestrial gastropod mollusk in the family Philomycidae.

Anatomy
These slugs create and use love darts as part of their mating behavior. The dart of Philomycus carolinianus is thick and curved.

References

External links

 Philomycus carolinianus on the UF / IFAS Featured Creatures Web site

Philomycidae
Fauna of the Eastern United States
Fauna of the Great Lakes region (North America)
Fauna of the Southeastern United States
Gastropods described in 1802